Siege of Multan may refer to,

 Siege of Multan, 1296–1297, Alauddin Khalji's conquest of Multan.
 Siege of Multan (1780), Afghans reconquer Multan.
 Siege of Multan (1810), Sikhs capture Multan and Multan governor realizes tribute.
 Siege of Multan (1818), Sikhs capture Multan from the Afghans
 Siege of Multan (1848-1849), between British East India Company and the Sikh Empire.

History of Multan